Jabat Island (or Jabot Island or Jabwot Island; Marshallese:) is an island in the Pacific Ocean, and forms a legislative district of the Ralik Chain of the Marshall Islands. Unlike most of the other islands in the Marshall Islands, Jabat Island is a rocky island rather than a coral atoll, although it surrounded by fringing shallow water coral reefs that extend for several kilometres beyond the outer reef to the north and south. The population of Jabat Island was 84 in 2011.

History
First recorded sighting of Jabat Island was by the Spanish navigator Alonso de Arellano on 8 January 1565 on board of the patache San Lucas.

Jabat Island was claimed by the Empire of Germany along with the rest of the Marshall Islands in 1884, and the Germans established a trading outpost. Along with other German possessions in the Pacific, it was taken by the Empire of Japan during World War I and remained under Japanese rule during the interwar South Seas Mandate. Following the end of World War II, it came under the control of the United States as part of the Trust Territory of the Pacific Islands until the independence of the Marshall Islands in 1986.

Education
Marshall Islands Public School System operates Jabat Elementary School. Students are zoned to Jaluit High School in Jaluit Atoll.

References

External links
Marshall Islands site

Ralik Chain
Municipalities of the Marshall Islands